The Sambirano is a river of northwestern Madagascar in the region of Diana. It has its sources at the Maromokotra peak and flows through the Tsaratanana Reserve to the Indian Ocean. Its delta occupies 250 km.

The ecosystem of the river, mainly forests and brushland, has many indigenous species, such as the Sambirano mouse lemur and Sambirano woolly lemur.

The Madagascar dry deciduous forests occupy much of the river basin, although mangroves are evident at parts of the coastal fringe.

References

External links
 Monographie de la Région Diana (page 13)

Rivers of Diana Region

Rivers of Madagascar